Dixville Notch is an unincorporated community in Dixville township, Coos County, New Hampshire, United States. The population of the township, all of whom live in Dixville Notch, was 4 as of the 2020 census. The village is known for being one of the first places to declare its results during United States presidential elections and the New Hampshire presidential primary.

The village is the location of The Balsams Grand Resort Hotel, one of a handful of surviving New Hampshire grand hotels, situated on a  plot, accommodating golfing in the summer and skiing in the winter.

Dixville Notch is part of the Berlin, NH–VT Micropolitan Statistical Area.

Midnight voting tradition

Dixville Notch is best known in connection with its longstanding midnight vote in the U.S. presidential election, including during the New Hampshire primary (the first primary election in the U.S. presidential nomination process). In a tradition that started in the 1960 election, all the eligible voters in Dixville Notch gather at midnight in the ballroom of The Balsams. The voters cast their ballots and the polls are officially closed when all of the registered voters have voted – sometimes merely one minute later. The results of the Dixville Notch vote in both the New Hampshire primary and the general election are traditionally broadcast around the country immediately afterwards.

A similar tradition in the town of Hart's Location in adjacent Carroll County began in 1948; theirs was discontinued in the 1960s in light of the abundance of media attention, and revived only in 1996. Informal competition for the distinction of the first town to report election results has been ongoing for several election cycles, among a number of small communities, including:

 Coos County:
 Dixville Notch
 Millsfield (the township to the south of Dixville township)
 Carroll County (the next to the southeast):
 Hart's Location
 Grafton County (the next to the southwest of Coos):
 Ellsworth
 Waterville Valley

Press accounts occasionally falsely state that Dixville Notch "votes first" in U.S. presidential elections. However, the village does hold a number of voting records within the United States:

 Longest continuous record of midnight voting
 Highest count of midnight presidential primaries (13 as of 2008, vs. 5 to 9 for Hart's Location)
 At least one of the first handful of lawful votes (nationwide) in each presidential campaign's binding primaries
 Often first to report its returns

Dixville Notch was granted the authority to conduct its own elections in 1960 and chose to open its polls at midnight. In 1964, the primary election returns were the first in New Hampshire to be reported by UPI and the Associated Press. Since then, Dixville Notch has gained international media attention as the first community to vote in the presidential primary season (since New Hampshire's primary is required by state law to be scheduled earlier than any competitor). Dixville Notch also votes at midnight in the general presidential election in November, although this usually attracts less press attention than primary voting.

Although most New Hampshire polling stations open around sunrise and close in the early evening, Dixville Notch takes advantage of a state law that allows a precinct to close if all registered voters in that precinct have cast ballots. Consequently, all registered voters in Dixville Notch gather and are counted before the balloting takes place. The "Ballot Room" of the Balsams Hotel resort served as the polling place until a recent fire; this room featured separate voting booths for each citizen.

The tradition was first organized by prominent Dixville Notch resident Neil Tillotson (1898 – October 17, 2001), who was traditionally the first voter; he would reportedly hold his ballot over the ballot box while watching his wristwatch. At the moment of midnight, Tillotson would drop the ballot into the ballot box and the rest of the town's residents would follow suit. Since Tillotson's death from pneumonia in 2001 at the age of 102, the first voter has been chosen by random ballot beforehand.

In the presidential election of November 2, 2004, the village had 26 registered voters, roughly half of whom were registered as Republican; the other half were registered "undeclared" or unaffiliated with a party. New Hampshire law, however, allows a voter to declare or change a party affiliation upon arriving at the polling place, meaning that a number of the town's independent voters vote in the Democratic party primary.

The votes are counted immediately after all are received; the Dixville Notch results of the primary (and now the Hart's Location ones as well) often lead morning news programs on election day. During every election year between 1968 and 2012, the candidate with the plurality of Dixville Notch's voters has been the eventual Republican nominee for president. On the Democratic side, however, the village's election results have less often predicted the nominee. In 2000, for example, Bill Bradley won the most votes among Dixville Notch's Democratic primary voters, although Al Gore was the party's eventual nominee.

In 1992, the Libertarian Party unsuccessfully attempted to capitalize upon Andre Marrou's unexpectedly strong showing in Dixville Notch in the general election. In 2004, Democratic candidate Wesley Clark was the only contender to personally visit Dixville Notch; he was on hand when the votes were cast and counted, and he received the majority of Democratic votes cast. (Clark placed third and received only 13 percent of votes statewide.)

The community's voting tradition received a nod in the 2002 third-season episode of US television program The West Wing, in an episode entitled "Hartsfield's Landing", named after a town clearly modeled on either Dixville Notch, or its companion, Hart's Location.

In 2008, Senator Barack Obama became the first Democrat to win the community's vote in a presidential election since 1968, by a margin of 15 to 6.

In 2012, the Dixville Notch result delivered a tie for the first time in its history, with Barack Obama and Mitt Romney receiving five votes each.

In 2016, Democratic candidate Hillary Clinton won the community's vote, beating Republican candidate Donald Trump, 4 to 2, with Libertarian candidate Gary Johnson receiving one vote, and Mitt Romney receiving a single write-in vote. Eight people voted in total.

In 2019, the community was at risk of losing its ability to conduct its own election and having to combine with another municipality for voting, as its population had been reduced to four people, one too few to hold all the positions needed to conduct an election in New Hampshire. However, Dixville Notch received a reprieve before the primary when a fifth person (Les Otten, developer of The Balsams) agreed to move there in time for the election.

When the community's five residents convened for the 2020 primary, New York City Mayor Michael Bloomberg received three votes as a write-in candidate. The other two votes went to Democrats Pete Buttigieg and Bernie Sanders.

In 2020, former Vice President Joe Biden won over incumbent Republican Donald Trump, winning the votes of all five of the community's voting residents.

Federal election results
The eventual nationwide winners for each contest are indicated in bold.

In popular culture 
The community's voting tradition received a nod in the 2002 third-season episode of US television program The West Wing, in an episode entitled "Hartsfield's Landing", named after a town modeled on either Dixville Notch, or its companion, Hart's Location.

See also

 Hart's Location, New Hampshire
 List of mountain passes in New Hampshire
 New Hampshire Historical Marker No. 171: Dixville Notch – "First in the Nation"

References

Berlin, New Hampshire micropolitan area
New Hampshire presidential primaries
Unincorporated communities in Coös County, New Hampshire
Unincorporated communities in New Hampshire